In statistics, the logit function is the quantile function associated with the standard logistic distribution. It has many uses in data analysis and machine learning, especially in data transformations.

Mathematically, the logit is the inverse of the standard logistic function , so the logit is defined as

.

Because of this, the logit is also called the log-odds since it is equal to the logarithm of the odds  where  is a probability.

Definition

The base of the logarithm function used is of little importance in the present article, as long as it is greater than 1, but the natural logarithm with base  is the one most often used. The choice of base corresponds to the choice of logarithmic unit for the value: base 2 corresponds to a shannon, base  to a “nat”, and base 10 to a hartley; these units are particularly used in information-theoretic interpretations. For each choice of base, the logit function takes values between negative and positive infinity.

The “logistic” function of any number  is given by the inverse-:

The difference between the s of two probabilities is the logarithm of the odds ratio, thus providing a shorthand for writing the correct combination of odds ratios only by adding and subtracting:

History
There have been several efforts to adapt linear regression methods to a domain where the output is a probability value, instead of any real number . In 1934 Chester Ittner Bliss used the cumulative normal distribution function to perform this mapping and called his model probit an abbreviation for "probability unit";. However, this is computationally more expensive. In 1944, Joseph Berkson used log of odds and called this function logit, abbreviation for "logistic unit" following the analogy for probit:

Log odds was used extensively by Charles Sanders Peirce (late 19th century). G. A. Barnard in 1949 coined the commonly used term log-odds; the log-odds of an event is the logit of the probability of the event. Barnard also coined the term lods as an abstract form of "log-odds", but suggested that "in practice the term 'odds' should normally be used, since this is more familiar in everyday life".

Uses and properties

 The logit in logistic regression is a special case of a link function in a generalized linear model: it is the canonical link function for the Bernoulli distribution.
 The logit function is the negative of the derivative of the binary entropy function.
 The logit is also central to the probabilistic Rasch model for measurement, which has applications in psychological and educational assessment, among other areas.
 The inverse-logit function (i.e., the logistic function) is also sometimes referred to as the expit function.
 In plant disease epidemiology the logit is used to fit the data to a logistic model. With the Gompertz and Monomolecular models all three are known as Richards family models.
 The log-odds function of probabilities is often used in state estimation algorithms because of its numerical advantages in the case of small probabilities. Instead of multiplying very small floating point numbers, log-odds probabilities can just be summed up to calculate the (log-odds) joint probability.

Comparison with probit 

Closely related to the  function (and logit model) are the probit function and probit model. The  function is denoted , where  is the CDF of the standard normal distribution, as just mentioned:

As a result, probit models are sometimes used in place of logit models because for certain applications (e.g., in Bayesian statistics) the implementation is easier.

See also 
 Sigmoid function, inverse of the logit function
 Discrete choice on binary logit, multinomial logit, conditional logit, nested logit, mixed logit, exploded logit, and ordered logit
 Limited dependent variable
 Daniel McFadden, a Nobel Prize in Economics winner for development of a particular logit model used in economics
 Logit analysis in marketing
 Multinomial logit
 Ogee, curve with similar shape
 Perceptron
 Probit, another function with the same domain and range as the logit
 Ridit scoring
 Data transformation (statistics)
 Arcsin (transformation)
 Rasch Model

References

Further reading

Logarithms
Special functions